Tahmoures Pournazeri (born 8 February 1977) is an Iranian multi-instrumentalist and Iranian traditional musician. He is a member of Shamss Ensemble since 1989, along with his father Kaykhosro Pournazeri and his brother Sohrab pournazeri.

He has been acclaimed by the U.S. Senate for composing music for the International Norooz Celebration, and collaborated with artists like Joan Baez, Shujaat Hussain Khan, and the great master Mohammad Reza Shajarian. He has composed for fifteen albums covering six genres of music, participated in the Avignon Festival at the age of 15, won first honours among Young Iranian Talents at age 14, and performed with the Shams Ensemble at Iran's most celebrated concert halls starting at age 12.

Early Age 
Tahmoures was born in February 1977 to the musical Pournazeri family. His father Kaykhosro Pournazeri is known as the father of Sufi music and of the Tanboor, his grandfather Haji Khan was a distinguished Tar player.

Career 
Tahmoures' knowledge in the fields of Iranian tribal and traditional music, as well as western-style composition, has allowed him to create a new and original style – which is considered a great accomplishment in Eastern music.

Along with his father Kaykhosro and his brother Sohrab, Tahmoures leads and directs the Shamss Ensemble – considered one of Iran's foremost musical groups. He plays all the major Iranian instruments, concentrating especially on the Tar, Setar, Tanboor, Barbat, and Daf – and has experimented with and composed for new instruments designed by Mohammad Reza Shajarian.

Tahmoures continues to compose in the fields of mystical music, modern Iranian classical music, Kurdish music, symphonic orchestral music, and modern fusion. He also has extensive experience in the field of music recording.

His cooperation with Homayoun Shajarian, the celebrated Iranian singer, has led to a best-selling album, ‘Beyond Any Form’, and the highest-grossing concert tour in the history of Iranian music, with a total audience of over 120,000. The album also features Sohrab Pournazeri on the Kamancheh, American composer David K. Garner, Indian Sitar virtuoso Shujaat Khan, Venezuelan flautist Pedro Eustache, and American blues guitarist Jimmy Johnson.

He performed at NPR with Mohammadreza Shajarian and Sohrab Pournazeri.

Discography

Concerts 

 Shamss Ensemble, Kaykhosro Pournazeri, Homayoun Shajarian, Feb 7, 2020, Brussels, Palais des Beaux-Arts - BOZAR
 Shamss Ensemble, Kaykhosro Pournazeri, Homayoun Shajarian, 8, Feb 9, 2020, Theatre de la Ville, Espace Cardin, Paris
Iran-e Man Concert Tour - Europe, Gothenburg, Sweden, Manchester, London, Frankfort, Düsseldorf (2019)
 Shamss Ensemble, Kaykhosro Pournazeri, Homayoun Shajarian, sep 30, 2018, Konya Mystic Music Festival, Melvina Cultural Center
 Homayoun Shajarian, Sohrab and Tahmoures Pournazeri, Dec 4, 2018, Cemal Reşit Rey (CRR) Concert Hall, Istanbul

References 

Mystic World Music
تهمورس پورناظری از برنامه‌های جدید گروه شمس می‌گوید‌
Musicaneh

External links
Official website

1977 births
Living people
Iranian tonbak players
Persian classical musicians
People from Kermanshah
Musicians from Kermanshah
Iranian kamancheh players
Iranian setar players
Iranian tar players
Iranian dutar players
21st-century drummers
Barbad award winners